John Mackintosh or John McIntosh (–1840) was an Irish luthier and professor who worked in Dublin. Towards the end of his career, he wrote a short publication on violin making and the Cremonese school. One of his violins is preserved as part of a collection at the National Museum of Ireland, Dublin.

Early life

Very little is known about Mackintosh's early life. While it is well documented that he spent most of his adult life living and working in Dublin, it is thought that he was born in Scotland.

Career

Mackintosh probably began his career as a luthier in the early 1800s. He was apprenticed to Dublin maker Thomas Perry at 6 Anglesea Street between 1808 and 1817. There, he honed his skills as a violin maker and adopted many traits typical of the Perry school. In particular, he gained an appreciation for the Cremonese style of violin making. By this time, his teacher Perry had already adopted the Amati model, which Perry is said to have studied directly from an Amati instrument lent to him by the Duke of Leinster. Additionally, Mackintosh would typically brand his violins at the back below the button 'MACKINTOSH/DUBLIN', a signature of the Perry school.

Following his apprenticeship to Perry, Mackintosh set up his own workshop at 1 Essex Quay, Dublin, in 1817. Mackintosh's choice of address was likely not haphazard; there were various skilled craftsmen, such as watchmakers, clockmakers and other musical-instrument makers, on the quay during first half of the nineteenth century. Probably the most notable craftsman to work on Essex Quay was the Dublin medallist William Mossop (1751–1804), who resided at 13 Essex Quay from 1784, where his son, also William (1788–27), succeeded him. In fact, it is believed that Mackintosh shared his premises with a pipemaker named Timothy Kenna, who had earlier succeeded his father's business on Essex Quay. It is probably no coincidence that Kenna also used to brand his instruments 'KENNA/DUBLIN'. Such branding, which is not common in violin-making, may have been inherited by Irish luthiers from working in close proximity with Irish pipemakers.

In 1819, Mackintosh moved to 10 Essex Quay, where he worked until 1824. Around the same time, John Dollard, another former apprentice of Perry's, moved to 15 Essex Quay. In 1825, Mackintosh moved to 11 Astor's Quay, where he remained until 1834. This was another area where notable Dublin luthiers had previously resided, such as George Ward. From 1834 onwards, Mackintosh resided at 12 Lower Ormond Quay. In 1837, Mackintosh published a short book on violin making titled Remarks on the Construction and Materials Employed in the Manufacture of Violins. In the book, he deals with the topics of wood, tone, bridge and sound post, and the Cremonese school. In particular, he stresses the importance of choosing good quality, mature timber with pores of a certain size and formation. Furthermore, he states that age is not necessary to produce a good instrument and that violins as good as those of the Cremonese school can be achieved by contemporary makers with the correct approach. Mackintosh continued to work at Lower Ormond Quay until his death in 1840.

Mackintosh based his violins broadly on Italian models, including Amati, Stradivari and Guarneri. In his 1837 publication, Mackintosh states that he had studied each of these makers in great detail, particularly Stradivari, of whom he had several instruments pass through his hands. Mackintosh also experimented greatly in pursuit of replicating the old Italian masters' instruments. He states that he tried "steaming, steeping, stoving, boiling, and baking the timber; I have also used all kinds of spirits, caustics, and acids, but all these disorganised the pores and impaired the fibres of the timber". He also states that he discovered the process by which such instruments could be achieved, and that 16 years earlier he had produced "three violins of timber which had been in a certain situation for a particular purpose" which were since reported by their owners to be as good as any Cremona instrument.

Extant instruments

It is unknown how many instruments Mackintosh produced in his lifetime. One of his violins is preserved in the National Museum of Ireland as part of a collection of musical instruments by Irish makers. The collection also includes instruments by other 18th and 19th century luthiers including Mackintosh's teacher, Perry, as well as John Delany, Thomas Molyneux and George Ward.

Some of Delany's extant instruments:

 : labelled 'Made by John Mackintosh, No. 1 Essex Quay, Dublin'
 (?): National Museum of Ireland, Dublin
 (?): branded 'McIntosh of Dublin'

Publications

 Mackintosh J. (1837) Remarks on the Construction and Materials Employed in the Manufacture of Violins. Dublin: Martin Keene & Son.

See also
John Delany (Irish luthier)
Thomas Molineux (Irish luthier)
Thomas Perry (Irish luthier)
George Ward (Irish luthier)

References

External links
 John Mackintosh on Dublin Music Trade
 John Mackintosh on Brian Boydell Card Index
 John Mackintosh on Tarisio
 John McIntosh on Tarisio
 Catalogue of Mackintosh's 1837 publication at National Library of Australia

1840 deaths
19th-century Irish businesspeople
19th-century Irish people
Bowed string instrument makers
Businesspeople from County Dublin
Irish luthiers
Irish musical instrument makers